David Jonothan Quest is a politician in Alberta, Canada, who was elected to the province's Legislative Assembly on March 3, 2008 as the Progressive Conservative MLA for Strathcona-Sherwood Park.

Political career
Quest served two terms as MLA, first for Strathcona, and subsequently for Strathcona-Sherwood Park. In addition to his regular duties as an MLA, he had roles on many committees during his term, including as Chair of the Cabinet Policy Committee on Finance. However, he was defeated in 2015 along with most of the Progressive Conservative caucus.

Quest defended his successor, Estefan Cortes-Vargas, when The Rebel Media published personal attacks against them, stating that "to be attacked as an individual based on your sexuality or your country of birth is inexcusable."

Quest was appointed Associate Minister of Seniors in 2013 under Premier Alison Redford.

Having opposed Jason Kenney's bid for leadership of the Progressive Conservatives, Quest joined the Alberta Party and was the party's candidate in Strathcona-Sherwood Park in 2019.

Personal life
Quest graduated from Ardrossan Senior High School, obtained his post-secondary education from NAIT, and in 1985 graduated with a business administration diploma with a major in marketing management. He obtained a private pilot's licence in 1998 and regularly attends the Ardrossan United Church.

Quest is married to wife Fiona Beland-Quest.

Electoral history

References

External links 
 Voting results from Elections Alberta

People from Sherwood Park
Progressive Conservative Association of Alberta MLAs
Living people
1963 births
Alberta Party candidates in Alberta provincial elections
21st-century Canadian politicians